Anklam is a railway station in the town of Anklam, Mecklenburg-Vorpommern, Germany. The station lies on the Angermünde–Stralsund railway and the train services are operated by Deutsche Bahn.

Train services
The station is served by the following services:

Intercity-Express services (ICE 28) (Binz -) Stralsund - Eberswalde - Berlin - Leipzig - Jena - Nuremberg - Munich (- Innsbruck)
Intercity services (IC 32) Binz - Stralsund - Eberswalde - Berlin - Hanover - Dortmund - Essen - Duisburg - Düsseldorf - Cologne
Regional services  Stralsund - Greifswald - Pasewalk - Angermünde - Berlin - Ludwigsfelde - Jüterbog - Falkenberg - Elsterwerda

References

Station
Railway stations in Mecklenburg-Western Pomerania
Buildings and structures in Vorpommern-Greifswald
Railway stations in Germany opened in 1863